Biroina is a genus of flies belonging to the family Lesser Dung flies.

Species
B. brevior Richards, 1973
B. burckhardti Papp, 1995
B. capitalis (Richards, 1973)
B. dodo (Richards, 1973)
B. dorrigonis (Richards, 1973)
B. fenestrata (Richards, 1973)
B. fuscalis (Richards, 1973)
B. hardyina (Richards, 1973)
B. myersi (Richards, 1973)
B. myrmecophila (Knab & Malloch, 1912)
B. nitidipleura (Richards, 1973)
B. orientalis Papp, 1995
B. percostata (Richards, 1973)
B. subsinuata (Richards, 1973)
B. symmetrica (Richards, 1973)
B. topali Papp, 1995
B. trivittata (Richards, 1973)
B. vernalis (Richards, 1973)
B. wilsoni (Richards, 1973)

References

Sphaeroceridae
Diptera of Australasia
Diptera of Asia
Sphaeroceroidea genera